Olga Danilović and Marta Kostyuk were the defending champions, but both players chose not to participate.

Top seeds Cori Gauff and Caty McNally won the title, defeating Hailey Baptiste and Dalayna Hewitt in an all-American final, 6–3, 6–2.

Seeds

Draw

Finals

Top half

Bottom half

External links 
 Main draw

Girls' Doubles
US Open, 2018 Girls' Doubles